Korean American literature treats a wide range of topics including Korean life in America, the intersection of American and Korean culture in the lives of young Korean Americans, as well as life and history on the Korean peninsula.

To be included in this list, the person must have a Wikipedia article showing they are Korean American writers or must have references showing they are Korean American writers and are notable.

Korean American writers
 Jung-hyo Ahn
 Matthew J. Baek
 Haemi Balgassi
 Kendare Blake
 Steph Cha
 Theresa Hak Kyung Cha (1951–1982)
 Leonard Chang
 Alexander Chee
 Sook Nyul Choi
 Susan Choi
 Daniel Chun
 Catherine Chung 
 Nicole Chung
 Susan Ee
 Heinz Insu Fenkl
 Jenny Han
 Johanna Hedva
 Euny Hong
 Cathy Park Hong
 Y. Euny Hong
 Grace Jung
 Jay Caspian Kang
 Minsoo Kang
 Younghill Kang (1903–1972)
 Nora Okja Keller
 Alice Sola Kim
 Derek Kirk Kim
 Elaine H. Kim
 Elizabeth Kim
 Eugenia Kim
 Mike Kim
 Myung Mi Kim
 Nancy Kim
 Patti Kim (1970–)
 Richard E. Kim
 Ronyoung Kim (1926–1987)
 Suji Kwock Kim
 Suki Kim
 Cecilia Hae-Jin Lee
 Chang-Rae Lee
 Don Lee 
 Ed Bok Lee
 Helie Lee
 Janice Y. K. Lee
 Marie Myung-Ok Lee
 Mary Paik Lee
 Min Jin Lee
 Yoon Ha Lee
 Young Jean Lee
 Walter K. Lew
 Eugene Lim
 Nami Mun
 An Na
 Greg Pak
 Linda Sue Park
 Therese Park
 Yongsoo Park
 Sun Yung Shin
 Cathy-Lynn Song
 Kim Sunée
 Brenda Paik Sunoo
 Jane Jeong Trenka
 Sung J. Woo
 Paul Yoon
 Monica Youn
 Gabrielle Zevin

See also
List of Asian American writers
Asian American literature
Asian American Literary Awards
Asian/Pacific American Awards for Literature

External links
University of California, Los Angeles
University of Wyoming, Chung-Souk Han
Korean American literature: Bibliography of Korean American authors and their books.

Korean